"With My Own Two Hands" is a single from Ben Harper's 2003 release Diamonds on the Inside.

The lyrics focus on how changes in the world can come about when a single person decides to take action. The song, which features an up-tempo reggae groove, was played in regular rotation on European radio stations. The song's popularity in Europe was such that Ben Harper was awarded French Rolling Stones "Artist of the Year" ("Artiste de l'année") in 2003. An alternate version featuring Jack Johnson is also featured on the Curious George film soundtrack Sing-A-Longs and Lullabies for the Film Curious George.

The B-side to the single was "Bring the Funk", also taken from Diamonds on the Inside. It has been included on some TV programs as background music.

References

2002 songs
Ben Harper songs
2002 singles
Virgin Records singles
Songs written by Ben Harper